Dalbygda is a village in the municipality of Indre Fosen in Trøndelag county, Norway. The area had its own school until 1966 when it was closed and the students now go to Leksvik school. The village lies in a valley that is assumed to have been a glacial lake that eventually drained into the sea. The flat area is a typical farming village with agriculture and livestock.-

References

Villages in Trøndelag
Indre Fosen